Eric Rohmann (born 1957) is an American author and illustrator of children's books. He is a graduate of Illinois State University and Arizona State University. He won the 2003 Caldecott Medal for U.S. picture book illustration, recognizing My Friend Rabbit, and he was a runner-up in 1995 for Time Flies. He created a popular series based on a bulldozer that began with Bulldozer’s Big Day.

Picture books

 Time Flies (1994)
 The Cinder-Eyed Cats (2001)
 My Friend Rabbit (2002)
 Pumpkinhead (2003)
 Clara and Asha (2005)
 A Kitten Tale (2008)
 Last Song (2010)
 Bone Dog (2011)
 Oh, No! (2012) (Illustrator)
 A Kitten Tale (2012)
 Bless This Mouse (2015) (Illustrator)
 Bulldozer's Big Day (2015) (Illustrator)
 Bulldozer Helps Out (2017) (Illustrator)

Personal life
Rohmann was raised one of three children and currently lives and works in Illinois. He was not a big reader as a child, instead seeing the world in images. Rohmann is married to Candace Fleming and the couple have collaborated on projects including Oh, No!. He is partial to coffee, popcorn, and Delacroix’s The Death of Sardanapalus.

References

External links

 
Reading Rockets Video Interview
Seven Impossible Things Interview
 

 

1957 births
Living people
American children's book illustrators
American children's writers
Arizona State University alumni
Caldecott Medal winners
Illinois State University alumni
Robert F. Sibert Informational Book Medal winners